Glorium was a prolific art punk band that formed in San Antonio, Texas, in 1991. After moving to Austin, Texas, in 1992, they released several 7-inch records and albums, many on local Austin independent record labels. Their music is a blend of post-punk, emo, art rock, classic rock, garage rock, progressive rock and noise rock with a strong DIY ethic.

They toured the United States throughout the 90's, sharing the stage with diverse acts as Fugazi, At the Drive-In, Lungfish, Slant 6, Jawbreaker, Hoover, Six-Finger Satellite, Spoon, Ruins, Brainiac, Shudder To Think, Seaweed, ...And You Will Know Us by the Trail of Dead, The Grifters, Man or Astroman?, Ed Hall, Trenchmouth, The Meices, playing basements, house shows, and clubs while booking their own shows, culminating in opening for Fugazi on their Southeastern tour in 1996 along with Branch Manager. Tim Kerr (of Big Boys, Poison 13, among many others bands) produced their third single and first full-length album, Cinema Peligrosa in 1994.

Glorium went on a hiatus in 1997 but still reconvene to play the occasional show, most recently playing a benefit for the DJ Jonathan Toubin in December 2011 during the last week of Emo's downtown.

Members

George Lara – Bass guitar
Juan Ramos – Drums
Ernest Salaz – Guitar, background vocals
Lino Max – Guitar, background vocals
Paul Streckfus – vocals

Discography

Albums

Cinema Peligrosa (1994) Undone Records (produced by Tim Kerr)
Eclipse (1997) Golden Hour Records
Past Life Recordings (1997) Existential Vacuum Records
Close Your Eyes (1998) Golden Hour Records
Fantasmas (2004) Golden Hour Records

Singles

Divebomb b/w Chemical Angel (1992) Existential Vacuum Records
Iced The Swelling b/w Fearless (1992) Unclean Records
Hour One & Counting (1993) Unclean Records split 7-inch with El Santo
G93 (1994) Powernap Records split 7-inch with Gut
Black Market Hearts b/w Walkie-Talkie (1997) Golden Hour Records
Psyklops b/w Future News From The Front Line (2001) Tranquility Base

EPs

Phantom Wire Transmissions (1994) Undone Records, Recorded at Sweatbox, Austin TX, Produced by Tim Kerr

Cassettes

Demolition EP (1992) self-released
Dream of the Insect Queen (1995) Bobby J
Sound Recordings from the Front Room (1995) Golden Hour Records
Dead Air Station Wagon (1995) Golden Hour Records
Club Chit Chat (1997) Golden Hour Records

Compilation albums
Live at Emo's CD (1994) Rise Records
Seek Sound Shelter CD (1994) Dot/Zit Records
Austin Live Houses Cassette (1995) Golden Hour Records
Econo*Pep*Rally Cassette(1995) Couchfort Zine
Crispy Chronicles CD (1996) Speed Records
Live On KVRX: Local Live Vol. 1 CD (1997) KVRX UT Austin
Capitol City Signals Cassette (1997) Golden Hour Records
The Eagle Has Landed 2x12" LP (1998) Tranquillity Base (Bryn Mawr, PA)
Secret Grrrl Conspiracy Cassette (2000) Chapter 5

References

Rock music groups from Texas